The Reeds is a residential suburb in Centurion southwest of Pretoria, Gauteng, South Africa.

References

Suburbs of Centurion, Gauteng